Megachile insularis is a species of bee in the family Megachilidae. It was described by Smith in 1859.

References

Insularis
Insects described in 1859